Tmesisternus mucronatus is a species of beetle in the family Cerambycidae. It was described by Charles Joseph Gahan in 1916.

References

mucronatus
Beetles described in 1916